Angel of the Winds may refer to:

 Angel of the Winds Casino Resort, an Indian casino near Arlington, Washington, US
 Angel of the Winds Arena, an indoor arena in Everett, Washington, US